Manhattan Motorcars is a New York City mega luxury car dealership service provider. It is the only official Lamborghini, Bentley, Rolls-Royce, Spyker, Porsche, Bugatti and Lotus dealer in NYC. It is located at 270 Eleventh Avenue in a building that belongs to Michael Dezer, who is an influential real estate developer and car collector.

After 20 years of selling Porsches at its original location, in 2014, it was announced that Porsche and Manhattan Motorcars were building a new Porsche NYC headquarters  on Eleventh Avenue (Manhattan). The new location would be 125,000 square feet with the rights to build out another 60,000 square feet.

In March 2014, Koenigsegg Supercars announced that it was appointing Manhattan Motorcars as its main point of sale for America's northeast. The supercar company had three North American dealers to cover the U.S. and Canada.

Philanthropy
In 2014, Manhattan Motorcars and its owner Brian Miller participated with other auto dealers in the New York metropolitan area with the donation of more than 3,000 coats to the needy in the midst of one of the coldest and snowiest winters on record. Auto dealers in the New York metropolitan area got together to contribute and make the donation. Manhattan Motorcars often was the host to charitable events including the annual Our Place (organization) VIP Blackjack tournament.

Media Reception
The company has been quoted and sometimes mentioned in the media, including former news publications such as the Wall Street Journal, the New York Times, the Daily News (New York)  and others.

References

External links 
Manhattan Motorcars

Companies based in New York City